A bone seeker is an element, often a radioisotope, that tends to accumulate in the bones of humans and other animals when it is introduced into the body.  An example is strontium-90, which behaves chemically like calcium and can replace the calcium in bones.  Other bone seekers include radium, and plutonium. An important thing to keep in mind is that - much like for toxic heavy metals the chemical state of the element may complicate such classifications. For example, while strontium, its oxides and hydroxides are all water-soluble and absorbed in the digestive tract or lungs (from whence they enter the bloodstream and ultimately accumulate in the bones), compounds such as strontium titanate are not, which explains their use in radioisotope thermoelectric generators. As such, while dissolved ions of the element or common compounds of the element (including its native form) may present the associated health risks, there are often forms which present much lower risks even as orphan sources or to non-target organs when administered internally in radiotherapy.

Bone-seeking elements are health risks but have uses in oncology.

See also
 ATC code V10B Pain palliation (bone seeking agents), a group of pharmaceutical bone seekers

References

Isotopes
Radiobiology